"Gonna Make You an Offer You Can't Refuse" is a song written in 1973 by John Worth, a pseudonym used by John Worsley (also known as Les Vandyke). It was originally sung by the American soul singer Jimmy Helms, and the track was arranged by Mike Moran. The single was issued by Cube Records in the UK.

The single first charted in February 1973, and it peaked at No. 8 in the UK Singles Chart, spending ten weeks in that listing. The track is still played on BBC Radio 2, with three outings between August 2017 and February 2018.

Between 1972 and 1975, Helms recorded prolifically for the Cube label, largely due to the success of this song. However, he did not have another solo hit in the UK, although Helms found further chart success in both the UK and US as part of Londonbeat in 1990s.

Cover versions
The song has also been recorded by Lisa Linn, and The Gentle Rain (also in 1973). Les McKeown also did a longer cover in his 1982 album, Heart Control.

Other information
The song has appeared on a number of compilation albums including Heart & Soul (1997), Everlasting Love (1999), and Helms's own earlier collection Gonna Make You An Offer... (1975).

References

External links
YouTube

1973 songs
1973 singles
Songs written by Les Vandyke
British soul songs
1970s ballads
Pop ballads